PTHS can refer to:
Paducah Tilghman High School
Parathyroid hormones
Pitt-Hopkins syndrome
Port Townsend High School
Pontiac Township High School
National Pingtung Senior High School
Proviso Township High Schools District 209
Pths is the abbreviation for the orchid genus Pleurothallis